Gyomaendrőd is a district in north-western part of Békés County. Gyomaendrőd is also the name of the town where the district seat is found. The district is located in the Southern Great Plain Statistical Region.

Geography 
Gyomaendrőd District borders with Karcag District (Jász-Nagykun-Szolnok County) to the north, Szeghalom District and Békés District to the east, Szarvas District to the southwest, Mezőtúr District (Jász-Nagykun-Szolnok County) to the west. The number of the inhabited places in Gyomaendrőd District is 5.

Municipalities 
The district has 2 towns and 3 villages.
(ordered by population, as of 1 January 2012)

The bolded municipalities are cities.

Demographics

In 2011, it had a population of 23,943 and the population density was 35/km².

Ethnicity
Besides the Hungarian majority, the main minorities are the Roma (approx. 700) and German (200).

Total population (2011 census): 23,943
Ethnic groups (2011 census): Identified themselves: 21,242 persons:
Hungarians: 20,172 (94.96%)
Gypsies: 688 (3.24%)
Others and indefinable: 382 (1.80%)
Approx. 2,500 persons in Gyomaendrőd District did not declare their ethnic group at the 2011 census.

Religion
Religious adherence in the county according to 2011 census:

Catholic – 4,823 (Roman Catholic – 4,806; Greek Catholic – 16);
Reformed – 3,910;
Evangelical – 233;
other religions – 221; 
Non-religious – 8,315; 
Atheism – 224;
Undeclared – 6,217.

Gallery

See also
List of cities and towns of Hungary

References

External links
 Postal codes of the Gyomaendrőd District

Districts in Békés County